Venusia is a genus of moths in the family Geometridae erected by John Curtis in 1839.

Species
Venusia accentuata (Prout, 1914)
Venusia albinea (Prout, 1938)
Venusia apicistrigaria (Djakonov, 1936)
Venusia balausta Xue, 1999
Venusia biangulata (Sterneck, 1938)
Venusia blomeri (Curtis, 1832)
Venusia brevipectinata Prout, 1938
Venusia cambrica Curtis, 1839
Venusia comptaria (Walker, 1860)
Venusia conisaria Hampson, 1903
Venusia crassisigna Inoue, 1987
Venusia dilecta Yazaki, 1995
Venusia distrigaria (Boisduval, 1833)
Venusia eucosma (Prout, 1914)
Venusia inefficax (Prout, 1938)
Venusia kasyata Wiltshire, 1966
Venusia kioudjrouaria Oberthür, 1893
Venusia laria Oberthür, 1893
Venusia lilacina (Warren, 1893)
Venusia limata Inoue, 1982
Venusia lineata Wileman, 1916
Venusia maniata Xue, 1999
Venusia marmoraria (Leech, 1897)
Venusia megaspilata (Warren, 1895)
Venusia naparia Oberthür, 1893
Venusia nigrifurca (Prout, 1926)
Venusia obliquisigna (Moore, 1888)
Venusia ochrota Hampson, 1903
Venusia pallidaria Hampson, 1903
Venusia paradoxa Xue, 1999
Venusia pearsalli (Dyar, 1906)
Venusia phasma (Butler, 1879)
Venusia planicaput Inoue, 1987
Venusia punctiuncula Prout, 1938
Venusia purpuraria (Hampson, 1895)
Venusia scitula Xue, 1999
Venusia semistrigata (Christoph, 1881)
Venusia sikkimensis (Warren, 1893)
Venusia syngenes Wehrli, 1931
Venusia tchraria Oberthür, 1893
Venusia violettaria Wehrli, 1931
Venusia yasudai Inoue, 1987

Status unclear
Venusia participata (Sauter, 1869), described as Eupithecia participata from East Prussia. It is sometimes attributed to Grentzenberg instead of Sauter.

References

 
Asthenini